The 1970 Westminster Titans football team was an American football team that won the NAIA Division II football national championship. They represented Westminster College, a small college in New Wilmington, Pennsylvania, with a total enrollment of 1,558 students, competing against other "small" colleges like Texas A&I with enrollments as high as 21,000.  The Titans competed as an independent during the 1970 NAIA Division II football season. In their 19th season under head coach Harold Burry, the Titans compiled a perfect 10–0 record and outscored opponents by a total of 284 to 62. Burry was inducted into the College Football Hall of Fame in 1996.

Schedule

Season overview

Marietta
The Titans out-gained the Pioneers by 319 yards of total offense to 113. Two of Westminster's starting backs, fullback Mark Acerni and halfback Joe Veres, were injured in the game. Quarterback Dave Bierbach threw a 39-yard touchdown pass to Roger Price and also scored on a quarterback sneak in the second quarter. John Ebersberger added two field goals and two extra points for Westminster.

Susquehanna
The Titans' defense held the Crusaders to 35 rushing yards, intercepted four passes, and recovered two Susqehanna fumbles. Linebacker Bob Matthews also blocked and simultaneously held onto a punt which he then returned for 25 yards and a touchdown.

Lycoming
Westminster quarterback Dave Bierbach completed eight of 12 passes for 119 yards and a touchdown and also rushed for 53 yards and a touchdown. Westminster safety Fran Tobias also intercepted a pass at the two-yard line and returned it 98 yards for a touchdown to give the Titans a 21–0 lead at halftime. A thunder storm limited the offensive production in the second half.

Waynesburg
The Titans out-gained the Yellow Jackets by 496 yards of total offense to only 68 yards. After the game, coach Burry said: "The boys play good hard football . . . This team is one of the best I've coached."

Heidelberg
Westminster quarterback threw two touchdowns to halfback Roger Price in the first quarter to take a 13–0 lead. The Titans then let Heidelberg back into the game by turning the ball over seven times on five fumbles and two interceptions. However, Heidelberg also turned the ball over seven times on five interceptions and two fumbles lost.

Homecoming: John Carroll
It was the 19th consecutive year in which the Titans won their homecoming game. Halfback Joe Veres accounted for the majority of Westminster's offensive output, tallying 69 rushing yards and 32 receiving yards. Veres scored two touchdowns, one on a 24-yard touchdown reception in the third quarter and the other on a 13-yard run in the fourth quarter.

Carnegie Mellon
The teams' total yardage was close (294 for Westminster, 226 for Carnegie Mellon), but Westminster capitalized on its scoring opportunities with four touchdowns to one for Carnegie Mellon. The Tartans also gave up four turnovers on two interceptions and two fumbles. Westminster's junior halfback Joe Veres scored two rushing touchdowns, and quarterback Dave Bierbach threw two touchdown passes.

Geneva
Westminster blocked three Geneva punts and forced three fumbles. Westminster scored both of its touchdowns on blocked punts in the first quarter. Westminster totaled only 59 yards of total offense and held Geneva to 44 yards. The teams combined for a total of six first downs. Coach Burry blamed the muddy field for the lack of offensive production.

NAIA Division II semifinal: Edinboro State
The Titans advanced to the NAIA Division II playoffs and defeated , 20–7, in its semifinal match before a crowd of 6,000 at Taggart Stadium in New Castle, Pennsylvania. Westminster tackle Mickey Annarella played a key role, recovering a fumble at the Edinboro 20-yard line and later blocking a punt at the Edinboro 41-yard line. Defensive back Ken Fassio also intercepted two passes. Westminster coach Harold Burry, who had been at Westminster's helm for 19 years, called the victory his "greatest win ever."

National Championship Game: Anderson
Westminster took a 21–0 lead at halftime and withstood 16 unanswered points from Anderson in the second half. Quarterback Dave Bierbach threw two touchdown passes to split end Dave Milliron. Halfback Joe Veres rushed for 105 yards.

Personnel

Key players
Quarterback Dave Bierbach was selected as the most valuable player in both the semifinals and championship game. Other key players on the 1970 team included linebacker Rich Hancox, offensive guard Fred Blackhurst, halfback Joe Veres, and split end Dave Milliren.

Roster

Offense
 Mark Acerni, fullback, 6'1", 210 pounds, junior
 Dave Bierbach, quarterback, 5'11", 180 pounds, senior
 Fred Blackhurst, right guard, 5'10", 195 pounds, junior
 Bill Cole, right end, 6'2", 195 pounds, sophomore
 Bill Fitts, left end, 6'2", 185 pounds, sophomore
 Pat Johnston, right tackle, 6'2", 220 pounds, senior
 Scot McClester, left guard, 6'0", 190 pounds, 215 pounds, senior
 Roger Neel, left tackle, 6'3", 215 pounds, sophomore
 Roger Price, halfback, 6'0", 175 pounds, senior
 Bill Sweterlitsch, center, 6'1", 210 pounds, sophomore
 Joe Veres, halfback, 5'9", 170 pounds, junior

Defense
 Mike Annarella, left tackle, 5'11", 215 pounds, junior
 Ned Becker, right end, 6'2", 190 pounds, senior
 Ken Fassio, halfback, 5'10", 170 pounds, junior
 Don Grimm, inside linebacker, 5'11", 205 pounds, junior
 Rick Hancox, outside linebacker, 5'9", 165 pounds, senior
 Bob Matthews, outside linebacker, 6'3", 195 pounds, senior
 Tom Nebel, left end, 5'11", 190 pounds, junior
 Marvin Smith, right tackle, 6'0", 210 pounds, junior
 John Thompson, safety, 5'11", 175 pounds, senior
 Fritz Tobias, halfback, 5'8", 170 pounds, senior
 Darryl West, inside linebacker, 6'2", 190 pounds, junior

References

Westminster
Westminster Titans football seasons
NAIA Football National Champions
College football undefeated seasons
Westminster Titans football